Barli is a Gram panchayat in Balijipeta mandal of Vizianagaram district, Andhra Pradesh, India. Barli is located between Bobbili town and Balijipeta, the mandal headquarters.

Demographics
 Indian census, the demographic details of Barli village are as follows
 Total population: 2,512 in 599 households.
 Male population: 1,223
 Female population: 1,290
 Children under 6 years of age: 273 (boys - 134 and girls - 139)
 Total literates: 1,180

References

Villages in Vizianagaram district